Asterivora urbana is a species of moth in the family Choreutidae. It is endemic to New Zealand and has been observed in Arthur's Pass. Adults are on the wing in January.

Taxonomy 
This species was first described by Charles E. Clarke in 1926, using specimens taken at Arthur's Pass on the open mountain-side at 4,000 ft. in January. Clarke originally named the species Simaethis chatuidea. In 1928 George Hudson discussed and illustrated this species under that name in his book The butterflies and moths of New Zealand. In 1979 J. S. Dugdale placed this species within the genus Asterivora. In 1988 Dugdale confirmed this placement. The male holotype specimen, as well as other specimens using in the naming of this species, are held at the Auckland War Memorial Museum.

Description 

Clarke described this species as follows:

Distribution
This species is endemic to New Zealand and has been observed in Arthur's Pass.

Behaviour 
Adults of this species is on the wing in January.

References

Asterivora
Moths of New Zealand
Moths described in 1926
Endemic fauna of New Zealand
Taxa named by Charles Edwin Clarke
Endemic moths of New Zealand